Joaquim Osório Duque-Estrada (April 19, 1870 – February 5, 1927) was a Brazilian poet, essayist, journalist, literary critic and professor. He is famous for writing in 1909 a poem that would become the lyrics of the Brazilian National Anthem in 1922.

He occupied the 17th chair of the Brazilian Academy of Letters from 1915 until his death in 1927.

Early life and education
Duque-Estrada was born in Paty do Alferes, in 1870, to Lieutenant Colonel Luís de Azeredo Coutinho Duque-Estrada and Mariana Delfim Duque-Estrada. His godfather was Manuel Luís Osório, the Marquess of Herval. He was sent to the Colégio Pedro II in 1882, graduating in Letters in 1888. Two years before, he published his first poetry book, Alvéolos (Alveoli).

Career
In 1887 he started to write for journals, such as A Cidade do Rio, collaborating with José do Patrocínio. In 1888 he started to defend the proclamation of the Republic in Brazil, alongside Antônio da Silva Jardim. In 1889 he moved to São Paulo in order to study at the Faculdade de Direito da Universidade de São Paulo, but would abandon the Law school in 1891 to become a diplomat. He would serve as a secretary in Paraguay, staying there for one year.

Later abandoning the diplomatic career, he became a professor at the Colégio Pedro II, but would quit his position to dedicate himself to journalism again, working as a literary critic at the Jornal do Brasil. His articles would be compiled and published in 1924, by the name of Crítica e Polêmica.

Death
He died in 1927.

Works
 Alvéolos (1886)
 A Aristocracia do Espírito (1889)
 Flora de Maio (1902)
 O Norte (1909)
 Anita Garibaldi (1911)
 A Arte de Fazer Versos (1912)
 Dicionário de Rimas Ricas (1915)
 A Abolição (1918)
 Crítica e Polêmica (1924)

External links
 
 Duque-Estrada's biography at the official site of the Brazilian Academy of Letters 

1870 births
1927 deaths
People from Rio de Janeiro (state)
19th-century Brazilian poets
Brazilian male poets
Brazilian diplomats
Brazilian literary critics
Brazilian journalists
Portuguese-language writers
University of São Paulo alumni
Members of the Brazilian Academy of Letters
19th-century Brazilian male writers
National anthem writers